The 1976 Australian Professional Championship was a professional non-ranking snooker tournament, which took place in September 1976.

Eddie Charlton won the tournament after the other finalist Paddy Morgan withdrew from the tournament in protest of Charlton being allowed to use his own personal set of snooker balls alongside his own choice of table.

Main draw

References

Australian Professional Championship
1976 in snooker
1976 in Australian sport